Green Lake Township may refer to the following places in the United States:

 Green Lake Township, Michigan
 Green Lake Township, Kandiyohi County, Minnesota

Township name disambiguation pages